Falla's skink (Oligosoma fallai), also known commonly as the Three Kings skink, is a species of lizard in the family Scincidae. The species is native to New Zealand.

Etymology
The specific name, fallai, is in honor of New Zealander ornithologist Robert Falla.

Geographic range
O. fallai is endemic to the Three Kings Islands off the coast of New Zealand. It is found nowhere else in the world.

Habitat
The preferred natural habitats of Falla’s skink are forest and shrubland.

Diet
O. fallai is omnivorous. It preys upon small invertebrates, and also eats carrion and fruits, including the fruit of the tītoki tree (Alectryon excelsus), the seeds of which it helps to disperse.

Reproduction
O. fallai is ovoviviparous. Young are born in January and February, and mean litter size is 4.5.

References

Further reading
McCann C (1955). "The lizards of New Zealand. Gekkonidae and Scincidae". Dominion Museum Bulletin (17): 1–127. (Leiolopisma fallai, new species, pp. 76–77).
Patterson GB, Daugherty CH (1995). "Reinstatement of the genus Oligosoma (Reptilia: Lacertilia: Scincidae)". Journal of the Royal Society of New Zealand 25 (3): 327–331. (Oligosoma fallai, new combination).
van Winkel D, Baling M, Hitchmough R (2020). Reptiles and Amphibians of New Zealand: A Field Guide. Princeton Field Guides. London, Oxford, New York, New Delhi, Sydney: Bloomsbury Wildlife. 368 pp. .

Oligosoma
Reptiles described in 1955
Taxa named by Charles McCann
Reptiles of New Zealand
Three Kings Islands
Taxonomy articles created by Polbot